Der Fluyten Lust-hof (The Flute's Pleasure Garden, or Garden of Delights) is a two-volume collection of music for recorder by Jacob van Eyck.  It is the largest collection of music for a single wind instrument ever published by a single composer.

It was first published in 1644 with further editions in 1646, 1649, 1654, and 1656. The pieces include folk songs, dance tunes, church works, Psalms, and songs of the day, including material adapted from van Eyck's own carillon music.

Although written for amateur players, the standard of musicianship in Utrecht was clearly of a high order as the pieces are considered challenging by modern standards.

References

Baroque compositions
Dutch music
Compositions for flute
Compositions for recorder
1644 books
1646 books
1649 books
1654 books
1656 books